The 2012 Gold Coast Titans season was the 6th in the club's history. Coached by John Cartwright and captained by Scott Prince they competed in the National Rugby League's 2012 Telstra Premiership. They finished the regular season 11th (out of 16), failing to make the finals for the second consecutive year. Nate Myles was named the club's player of the year.

Season summary

After their worst ever season which ended in their winning the wooden spoon in 2011, the Titans underwent significant player turnover, which included the signings of Nate Myles, Phil Graham and Jamal Idris amongst others.

On 26 July, The Titans announced changes to its management team including the appointment of a new CEO and new investors. David May, the former CMO of iSelect was named the new CEO of the Titans replacing Michael Searle who stood down as managing director to become executive director of football.

At the end of the season the Paul Broughton Medal for player of the year went to second-rower Nate Myles.

Milestones
Round 1: Luke Douglas, Jamal Idris and Nate Myles made their debuts for the club.
Round 2: Jordan Rankin scored his 1st career try.
Round 3: Mark Minichiello played his 200th career game and Matthew White played his 100th career game.
Round 3: Beau Champion made his debut for the club.
Round 4: Luke Douglas played his 150th career game.
Round 5: Luke Bailey played his 100th career game for the club and Luke O'Dwyer played his 100th career game.
Round 5: Brenton Lawrence scored his 1st career try.
Round 7: David Mead scored his 33rd career try which moved him into first on the all-time try scoring list for the Gold Coast Titans surpassing Anthony Laffranchi and Mat Rogers.
Round 7: Aidan Sezer made his debut for the club and his debut in the NRL.
Round 7: Aidan Sezer scored his 1st career try.
Round 7: William Zillman played his 100th career game.
Round 9: Phil Graham made his debut for the club, after previously playing for the Canberra Raiders and Sydney Roosters.
Round 10: Greg Bird played his 50th game for the club.
Round 14: Jamie Dowling made his debut for the club.
Round 16: Steve Michaels played his 100th career game.
Round 19: Beau Falloon made his debut for the club, after previously playing for the South Sydney Rabbitohs.
Round 23: Ben Ridge scored his 1st career try.
Round 25: Nate Myles played his 150th career game.

Squad List

Squad Movement

Gains

Losses

Re-signings

Ladder

Fixtures

Pre-season

Regular season

Statistics

Source:

Representative honours
The following players played a representative match in 2012.

Australian Kangaroos
Greg Bird
Nate Myles

Indigenous All Stars
Greg Bird
Jamal Idris
Scott Prince

NSW Blues
Greg Bird

NSW Country
Greg Bird
Luke Douglas

NRL All Stars
Luke Bailey

Queensland Maroons
Ashley Harrison
Nate Myles

References

Gold Coast Titans seasons
Gold Coast Titans season